TupiTube (also known as Tupi 2D) is a free and open-source 2D animation software for amateur artists, children and teenagers. It is available for Windows, Mac OS X, Unix-like operating systems, and Android. This project is developed and maintained by the Colombian startup, MaeFloresta. This project is covered under the terms of GPL-2.0-or-later.

History

Background and first versions:

TupiTube is the product of two young Colombian entrepreneurs from the city of Santiago de Cali who, in 2002, led the Ktoon initiative together with the companies Toonka Films and Soluciones Kazak. The software aims to be a tool to encourage young people throughout Latin America interested in the development of the animation industry. The incentive to build Tupi Tube was due to the founders goals to create a community of digital artists. 

Ktoon set the foundations to seek the first investments in the project, where entities such as Colciencias, the Sena, and others pushed the initiative during its first years of development. This financing model sustained the project in its early development stage. By 2010, the Ktoon developer team met and retook the project, now with the name of Tupi 2D Magic, and later configured MaeFloresta as the developer who maintains the vision of its predecessors, without abandoning the intention to remain as a free, accessible, and comfortable software for all the public interested in getting started to use.Tupi 2D Magic focuses its efforts on presenting itself as an experience where its users can animate, illustrate and design in different spaces, even becoming a tool in classrooms, reaching 400,000 students in India, where 3,000 schools used it as their software of preference.

News and trajectory:

MaeFloresta needs to continue its brand projection and Tupi 2D Magic deserved a restructuring to be able to grow to reach new audiences and stay in the market. This is why they transformed TupiTube with the intention of becoming institutionalized as the free 2D animation software preferred by children, young people, and digital artists in training.
It exists to pursue the goal of being a tool for artistic education in digital environments, addressing the academic possibilities that animation training can offer, and actively participates in events where ICTs and educational projects converge for the creation of a culture where technological education is also a priority.
Now, TupiTube's development team's efforts have begun to materialize. They have received different awards for their efforts, for hosting TupiTube and for being an example of entrepreneurship in the digital commerce boom.

Features

The software includes many features:
 Support for basic tools for vector illustration that includes rectangles, ellipses, lines, and polygons. Paths can also be created using the pen or pencil tool. The paint bucket tool can be used to fill bounded areas of vector objects.
 Raster images (sometimes called Bitmap) can be imported and used as either static backgrounds or animated assets.
 Finished animations can be exported to various file formats that include: Ogg Theora, AVI, MPEG, SWF. They may also be exported as a sequence of images in PNG, JPEG, or SVG format.
 Basic support for tweaking of positions, colors, rotation, scale, sheer, and opacity has been added to recent releases.
 The Library panel allows for the organization and reuse of imported media assets.

Future development
The goal of being a tool for introducing novice digital artists to the world of animation was fulfilled with the first release. Development is focused on reaching a professional level that will allow advanced users to make professional-quality animations.

Some of the areas of future development include: particles, sound support, key frames, and morphing. Plans have also been made to have skeleton animation with bones, inverse kinematics, and pivots.

See also
 List of 2D animation software

References

External links
 

Free 2D animation software
Free software programmed in C
Free software programmed in C++
Motion graphics software for Linux
Software that uses Qt